Krasnaya Burna (Qıźıl Burna) is a rural locality (a village) in Bedeyevo-Polyansky Selsoviet, Blagoveshchensky District, Bashkortostan, Russia. The population was 8 as of 2010. There is 1 street.

Geography 
Krasnaya Burna is located on the right bank of the Ufa River, 90 km northeast of Blagoveshchensk (the district's administrative centre) by road. Bulychevo is the nearest rural locality.

References 

Rural localities in Blagoveshchensky District